The Diocese of Savannah is a Latin Church ecclesiastical territory, or diocese, of the Catholic Church in the southern United States, comprising 90 counties in the south of Georgia. The diocese is led by a prelate bishop who serves as pastor of the mother church, Cathedral Basilica of Saint John the Baptist in Savannah. The Diocese of Savannah is a suffragan diocese, part of the ecclesiastical province under the metropolitan Archdiocese of Atlanta.  As of 2023, the bishop is Stephen D. Parkes.

Demographics
The Diocese of Savannah comprises 90 counties in southern Georgia. As of 2023, the diocese contained 80,000 Catholics.

History

1850 to 1870 
Pope Pius IX erected the Diocese of Savannah on July 3, 1850. The new diocese consisted of the state of Georgia and the state of Florida, minus the Florida Panhandle region.  The new diocese became a suffragan diocese of the Archdiocese of Baltimore. Pius IX appointed Reverend Francis Gartland from the Diocese of Philadelphia as the first bishop of the new diocese.

During Gartland's tenure, the Catholic population in the diocese doubled; more priests were added, including recruits from Ireland.  He erected three new churches and enlarged the Cathedral of St. John the Baptist in Savannah, dedicating it in June 1853. Gartland also established an orphanage and several Catholic schools.  Gartland died of yellow fever in 1854 while visiting the sick during an epidemic in Savannah.  The post of bishop was vacant for the next three years.

On January 9. 1857, Pius IX erected the Vicariate Apostolic of Florida and removed all of Florida from the Diocese of Savannah. At the same time, Pius IX named John Barry as bishop of Savannah.  Barry also had a short tenure, dying in France in 1859.  Pius IX appointed Bishop Augustin Vérot, then vicar apostolic of Florida, to be bishop of the Diocese of Savannah.

During the American Civil War, Vérot condemned the looting of the Catholic church at Amelia Island, Florida, by Union Army troops.  He personally evacuated several Sisters of Mercy from Jacksonville, Florida, to Savannah through the battle zone in Georgia. After the war, Vérot published a pastoral letter urging Catholics in the diocese to "put away all prejudice ...against their former servants".  He also advocated a national coordinator for evangelization among African-Americans, and brought in French sisters from LePuy, France, to work with them.

1870 to 1950 
Pius IX erected the new Diocese of St. Augustine in 1870 and appointed Vérot as its first bishop.  He named Bishop Ignatius Persico from the Roman Curia as Vérot's replacement in Savannah. 

Poor health forced Persico to resign this post in 1873. Pius IX then named William Gross of the Redemptorist Order in 1873 to become the new bishop of Savannah. During his tenure in Savannah, Gross laid the cornerstone of the Cathedral of Our Lady of Perpetual Help in November 1873 and dedicated it in April 1876. In addition to erecting several churches, schools, orphanages, and hospitals, he opened a men's college at Macon, Georgia, introduced the Jesuits and Benedictines to the diocese, and established a diocesan newspaper, The Southern Cross, in 1875. In 1885, Pope Leo XIII appointed Gross as archbishop of the Archdiocese of Oregon City.

Bishop Thomas Becker from the Diocese of Wilmington was appointed bishop of the Diocese of Savannah by Leo XIII in 1886. During his tenure, Becker added an episcopal residence to the Cathedral of St. John the Baptist in Savannah, which he completed with the building of its spires in 1896. After the cathedral was nearly destroyed by fire in 1898, he solicited funds for its rebuilding.

1900 to 1950 
After 13 years in office, Becker died in 1899. Leo XIII replaced him with Reverend Benjamin Keiley in 1900. During his tenure, Keiley completed the restoration of Cathedral of St. John the Baptist started by Becker; he dedicated the new edifice in October 1900. In other pronouncements, Keiley condemned prejudice and the lynchings of African-Americans. In 1902, Keiley memorialized Confederate States Army veterans from the American Civil War and praised former Confederate President Jefferson Davis.  Kelley condemned U.S. President Theodore Roosevelt for inviting the African-American educator Booker T. Washington to the White House.  Keiley opposed an initiative to set up a seminary for African-Americans in the diocese, saying:"In America no black man should be ordained. Just as illegitimate sons are declared irregular by canon law...so blacks can be declared irregular because they are held in such contempt by whites."In 1903, after a pronouncement by Pope Pius X on church music, Keiley prohibited his nuns from leading church choirs.  He complained to the Vatican that other dioceses in the United States were lenient on that rule.  In 1907, Keiley invited the Society of Missionaries of Africa to enter the diocese and build churches and schools for African-Americans.  After Keiley resigned due to poor health in 1922, Pope Pius XI appointed Reverend Michael Keyes of the Marist Brothers to be the new bishop of Savannah. On July 11, 1934, Keyes asked parishioners in his diocese to sign a pledge from the Legion of Decency to protest "...vile and unwholesome motion pictures." Keyes retired as bishop of Savannah in 1935.

Auxiliary Bishop Gerald O'Hara from the Archdiocese of Philadelphia was appointed bishop of the Diocese of Savannah by Pius XI in 1935.  During his tenure, O'Hara built the Cathedral of Christ the King in Atlanta, dedicated in January 1939. The cathedral was built on the former site of Ku Klux Klan gatherings, and O'Hara even invited Imperial Wizard Hiram Evans to the dedication. O'Hara once criticized  the Savannah Press after the newspaper ran a whimsical St. Patrick's Day editorial repeating the old fable crediting Saint Patrick with having granted women the privilege to woo during leap years. O'Hara was considered a leader in church efforts to improve race relations, launching a seven-point social and racial program in the 1930's, calling for aid to African American children and heightened awareness of rural issues.

Pius XI renamed the Diocese of Savannah as the Diocese of Savannah-Atlanta on January 5, 1937. This action reflected the increased population and rising prominence of Atlanta.  He also designated the Church of Christ the King in Atlanta as the co-cathedral in the second see.

1950 to present 
With the increased Catholic population in northern Georgia, Pope Pius XII on July 2, 1956, erected the Diocese of Atlanta.  Northern Georgia went into the new diocese and southern Georgia stayed into the newly renamed Diocese of Savannah. 

Pope John XXIII appointed Auxiliary Bishop Thomas J. McDonough from the Diocese of St. Augustine as auxiliary bishop in Savannah in 1957. O'Hara resigned as bishop of Savannah in 1959 to serve full time as a papal diplomat and John XXIII replaced him with McDonough.  He signed the "Pentecost Statement" of the bishops of the Atlanta Province, condemning racial discrimination as contrary to Christian principles.

On February 10, 1962, Pope John XXIII elevated the Diocese of Atlanta to the Archdiocese of Atlanta.  The Diocese of Savannah was removed from the Archdiocese of Baltimore and designated a suffragan of the new archdiocese.

In 1967, Pope Paul VI appoint McDonough as archbishop of the Archdiocese of Louisville and named Reverend Gerard Frey from the Archdiocese of New Orleans as his successor in Savannah.  During his tenure, Frey launched the Social Apostolate, a social service agency designed "to put people in the pews in touch with the poor." He also encouraged every church in the diocese to establish a parish council.  After appointing Frey as bishop of the Diocese of Lafayette in Louisiana in 1972, Paul VI named Reverend Raymond W. Lessard from the Diocese of Fargo to replace him in Savannah. Lessard once served as liaison between Catholic bishops and married Episcopalian clergy seeking Catholic ordination. He once described racism as "the paramount social problem affecting our area".

Pope John Paul II appointed J. Kevin Boland as bishop of Savannah in 1995.  After serving in the diocese for 15 years, Boland retired in 2010.  To replace him, Pope Benedict XVI named Reverend Gregory Hartmayer of the Conventual Franciscans to be the new bishop of Savannah.  In 2020, Pope Francis appointed Hartmayer as archbishop of the Archdiocese of Atlanta. Francis appointed Stephen D. Parkes from the Diocese of Orlando as bishop of Savannah.  Parkes is the current serving bishop. In 2022, Parkes announced that, on direction from the Vatican, the diocese would end the use of the Traditional Latin Masses (from the Roman Missal of 1962) in the diocese by May of 2023.

Sexual abuse

In 2004, the Diocese of Savannah reported that it had paid a total of $50,000 to 12 people who accused six diocesan priests of sexually abusing them. One accused priest, Wayland Brown was convicted and died in prison in 2019. Another accused priest, Lorenzo Garcia, was defrocked in 2008 without facing any criminal punishment. Henry Groomer, a third priest accused of sexual abuse, committed suicide in 2017 after being served with a lawsuit.

On November 4, 2009, the diocese agreed to a $4.24 million lawsuit settlement with Allan Ranta, another victim of sexual abuse by Brown.  Bishop Boland released this statement:I am sorry for all the pain and suffering experienced by Mr. Ranta and my prayers go out not only to him, but to all victims of child sexual abuse that each may find the healing they seek.The diocese reached a settlement in 2016 of $4.5 million to a man who accused Brown of sexually abusing him in the 1980's.  Authorities could not criminally charge Brown with this offense due to the statute of limitations.On November 12, 2018, Bishop Hartmayer released a list of 16 clergy from the diocese with credible accusations of sexual abuse of minors.  When Georgia Attorney General Christopher M. Carr announced an investigation in May 2019 into sexual abuse claims against Catholic clergy in Georgia, Hartmayer pledged the full support of the diocese.

On September 29, 2020, Bishop Parkes and the diocese were sued by William Fred Baker Jr.  Baker claimed that the diocese knew that Brown was molesting him in 1987 and 1988 when he was a 10 year old attending St. James Catholic School in Savannah.

Bishops

Bishops of Savannah
The diocese was founded in 1850 as the Diocese of Savannah, covering all of Georgia and part of Florida.  From 1937 to 1956, it was the Diocese of Savannah-Atlanta. In 1956, it became the Diocese of Savannah again when northern Georgia was split off into the Diocese of Atlanta.

Bishops of Savannah (1850 to 1937) 
 Francis Xavier Gartland (1850–1854)
 John Barry (1857–1859)
 Augustin Verot (1861–1870), appointed Bishop of Saint Augustine
 Ignatius Persico (1870–1874)
 William Hickley Gross, C.Ss.R. (1873–1885), appointed Archbishop of Oregon City
 Thomas Albert Andrew Becker (1886–1899)
 Benjamin Joseph Keiley (1900–1922)
 Michael Joseph Keyes, S.M. (1922–1935)
 Gerald Patrick Aloysius O'Hara (1935–1959), Archbishop (personal title) in 1950; appointed Apostolic Nuncio to Ireland and later Apostolic Delegate to Great Britain

Bishop of Savannah-Atlanta (1937 to 1956) 
 Gerald Patrick Aloysius O'Hara (1935–1959),

Bishop of Savannah (1956 to present) 

 Gerald Patrick Aloysius O'Hara (1935–1959),
 Thomas Joseph McDonough (1960–1967), appointed Archbishop of Louisville
 Gerard Louis Frey (1967–1972), appointed Bishop of Lafayette in Louisiana
 Raymond W. Lessard (1973–1995)
 J. Kevin Boland (1995–2011)
 Gregory John Hartmayer (2011–2020), appointed Archbishop of Atlanta
 Stephen D. Parkes (2020–present)

Auxiliary bishops
Francis Edward Hyland (1949–1956), appointed Bishop of Atlanta
Thomas Joseph McDonough (1957–1960), appointed Bishop of Savannah

Other bishops who were priests of this diocese
 Andrew Joseph McDonald, appointed Bishop of Little Rock in 1972
 Emmet M. Walsh, appointed Bishop of Charleston in 1927 and later Coadjutor Bishop of Youngstown succeeding to that see

Clergy and religious
As of 2007, the number of priests in the diocese stood at 102. Of these, 90 were serving actively, while 22 priests were in retirement status. There were 75 men who served the diocese as members of the permanent diaconate, as well as 82 religious (mostly nuns).

High schools
There are five Catholic high schools and 16 elementary schools in the diocese, serving over 6,000 students.

Aquinas High School, Augusta
Benedictine Military School, Savannah
Mount de Sales Academy, Macon
Pacelli High School, Columbus
St. Vincent's Academy, Savannah

See also

 Historical list of the Catholic bishops of the United States
 List of the Catholic dioceses of the United States
 List of Roman Catholic archdioceses (by country and continent)
 List of Roman Catholic dioceses (alphabetical) (including archdioceses)
 List of Roman Catholic dioceses (structured view) (including archdioceses)

References

External links
Roman Catholic Diocese of Savannah Official Site
Catholic Hierarchy Profile of the Diocese of Savannah

Savannah
Diocese of Savannah
Culture of Savannah, Georgia
Savannah
Savannah
Savannah
1850 establishments in Georgia (U.S. state)